The men's shot put event at the 1959 Summer Universiade was held at the Stadio Comunale di Torino in Turin on 3 September 1959.

Medalists

Results

Qualification
Qualification mark: 14.00 metres

Final

References

Athletics at the 1959 Summer Universiade
1959